Glossus is a genus of mostly extinct marine bivalve molluscs in the family Glossidae. Only the oxheart clam, G. humanus, is still extant, living in flat, muddy regions deep off the North Atlantic coastline of Europe.

Fossil records
All species of this genus, including the remaining extant species, G. humanus, are found in the fossil record from the Cretaceous to the Pliocene (age range: from 99.7 to 2.588 million years ago). Fossils are found in the marine strata of Eastern North America, Eurasia and the Indo-Pacific.

Species
The following species and synonmised taxa are (or have been) classified under Glossus:

 Glossus bronni
 Glossus conradi Gabb, 1860 (=Isocarida conradi)
 †Glossus fraterna Say, 1824 
 Glossus harpa
 Glossus humanus (Linnaeus, 1758)
 Glossus cyprinoides
 Glossus lamarckii
 Glossus lunulatus
 †Glossus markoei Conrad, 1842 
 †Glossus marylandica Schoonover, 1941 
 †Glossus mazlea Glenn, 1904 
 Glossus moltkiana
 Glossus sanguineomaculata
 †Glossus santamaria Ward, 1992 
 Glossus subtransversus
 Glossus vulgaris Reeve, 1845

Synonyms
 Glossus rubicundus Poli, 1795 accepted as Glossus humanus Linnaeus, 1758
 Glossus hibernicus Reeve, 1845 is a regional variant of Glossus humanus Linnaeus, 1758

Bibliography
 G. Owen - On The Biology Of Glossus Humanus (L.) (Isocardia Cor Lam.) Journal of the Marine Biological Association of the United Kingdom
 Huber M. (2010) Compendium of bivalves. A full-color guide to 3,300 of the world’s marine bivalves. A status on Bivalvia after 250 years of research. Hackenheim: ConchBooks. 901 pp., 1
 Guido Poppe und Yoshihiro Goto: European Seashells Volume 2 (Scaphopoda, Bivalvia, Cephalopoda). 221 S., Verlag Christa Hemmen, Wiesbaden 1993 (2000 unv. Nachdruck)

References

Glossidae
Bivalve genera
Taxa named by Giuseppe Saverio Poli